Warniłęg  (formerly German Warlang) is a village in the administrative district of Gmina Złocieniec, within Drawsko County, West Pomeranian Voivodeship, in north-western Poland.

Until the First Partition of Poland in 1772 the area was part of the Kingdom of Poland, 1772–1871 Prussia, 1871–1945 Germany, and after World War II it was reintegrated with Poland. During the war the Germans established and operated a forced labour camp for prisoners of war of various nationalities in the village.

The village has a population of 240.

References

Villages in Drawsko County